Pain Teens is compilation album the American noise rock and Industrial music band Pain Teens, released in 1988 by Anomie Records. It comprises music previously released by the band in cassette format, including songs from Manmade Disasters, Cathy and IV. It was later reissued, remixed, and remastered on CD and released on Charnel Music in 1998.

Reception

Tom Schulte of AllMusic calls the record "an important work of experimental guitar, sound manipulations and proto-industrial musical ethic."

Track listing

Personnel
Adapted from the Pain Teens liner notes.
Pain Teens
 Scott Ayers – guitar, drums, recording, production
 Bliss Blood – lead vocals

Release history

References

External links 
 Pain Teens at Bandcamp
 

1988 compilation albums
Pain Teens albums
Albums produced by Scott Ayers
Charnel Music albums